Michael Hasted (born 1945) is a British artist, writer and director for the theatre and photographer.

Early life
Michael Hasted was expelled from school at the age of 16 for spending more time backstage at his local repertory theatre, The Everyman in Cheltenham, than on his studies. Unable to accept the place he had been offered at the Bristol Old Vic Theatre School because he was too young to receive a grant, he spent the next few years working in rep all over Great Britain, notably The Everyman, Theatre Royal Lincoln, Queens Theatre, Horncurch and The Dundee Rep. He appeared in various productions with Steven Berkoff, Penelope Keith, James Bolam and John Savident. He was in the controversial You'll Come to Love Your Sperm Test by (and with) John Antrobus at the Traverse Theatre in Edinburgh in 1964. He also appeared in Z CARS on BBC TV.

Music career
He became involved in the music business in the mid 60s and was part of the Les Cousins in London's Soho where he designed their daily event poster and occasionally performed. He collaborated with Cat Stevens on a couple of songs, had a demo produced by Al Stewart and was backing singer on a couple of tracks of a Jeff Lynne album.

Artistic career
He continued working in the record industry as a photographer and sleeve designer photographing Hawkwind, Creedence Clearwater Revival, Ravi Shankar, Tiny Tim, Canned Heat, Free, Robert Palmer etc. etc. and did sleeves for The Groundhogs "Scratchin the Surface", Mike Batt "Schizophonia" and classical guitarist John Williams "The Height Below".

In the early 1970s, he also took up illustration and painting. He produced book jackets and magazine illustrations including for Playboy with whom he worked for 20 years.

His paintings have been exhibited in Europe, Japan and America and are in public collections in England, France, Greece and the United States.

In the mid 1980s, he went to live in France and from 1996 until his return to England in 2003, ran The English Bookshop in Montolieu, the book village in the south of France. He now works as a writer and theatre director, journalist and photographer and runs the on-line theatre magazine StageTalk Magazine. In 2011 he wrote a history of the Everyman Theatre in Cheltenham and wrote, produced and directed a revue in the theatre's Studio - 'Final Daze', featuring Robert Whelan, Wendy Abrahams and Steven Rayworth.

In October 2014, he produced and directed John Mortimer's play THE DOCK BRIEF at the Everyman starring Tweedy the Clown and Mark Hyde.

His book THESPIANS, actors' reminiscences of the 1940s to the 1970s with a foreword by Penelope Keith was published in December 2014.

Public collections owning pictorial works
 Arkansas Arts Centre Foundation, Little Rock, Arkansas, US
 Nora Eccles Harrison Museum of Art, Utah State University, Logan, US
 Macedonian Museum of Contemporary Art, Thessaloniki, Greece
 Westmoreland Museum of American Art, Greensburg, PA, US
 Museé d'Art Moderne, Strasbourg, France
 Polaroid (UK) Ltd.,

Selected bibliography
 THESPIANS by  Michael Hasted, FeedARead, December 2014
 A THEATRE FOR ALL SEASONS by  Michael Hasted, Jeremy Mills Publishing Ltd., England. September 2011
 The Cheltenham Book of Days by Michael Hasted. The History Press, England. March 2013
 Novum Gebrauchsgraphik (Munich) November 1973 pp. 28–33
 Munchner Merkur (Munich) 19 December 1975
 Graphis (Zürich) Spring 1978 p. 539
 Stern (Hamburg) 30 November 1978 p. 162
 Novum Gebrauchsgraphik (Munich) April 1979 pp. 41–50
 Munchner Merkur (Munich) 11 April 1979 p. 9
 Graphik (Munich) August 1979 pp. 24–25
 Leonardo (Paris) Summer 1980 pp. 186–191
 Graphis Annual 83/84 (Zürich) p. 222
 ART SYNECTICS by Nicholas Roukes. Davis Publications Inc. 1984 p. 26
 Novum Gebrauchsgraphik January 1993 pp. 44–47
 Hoggin' the Page  by Martyn Hanson. Northdown Publishing 2005 pp 46–51
 Front Cover  by Allan Powers, Mitchell Beazley 2006 p. 97

References

External links
 http://everymanbook.com
 https://web.archive.org/web/20090209080231/http://kevinwalsh.co.uk/francebooks.htm
 http://www.artfacts.net/index.php/pageType/instInfo/inst/12946/lang/1
 https://artfacts.net/artist/michael-hasted/179062
 https://web.archive.org/web/20081007194310/http://transitionsabroad.com/publications/magazine/0203/booktowns.shtml
 http://www.timesonline.co.uk/tol/travel/article885008.ece
 http://www.zdom.com/artistpainterpricesH8/HASTEDMichael.htm
 https://web.archive.org/web/20101005063245/http://epilog.de/Bibliothek/Alien-Contact/Beitrag/AC28_Gesicht_der_Buecher.htm

20th-century British painters
British male painters
21st-century British painters
British illustrators
Photographers from Gloucestershire
1945 births
Living people
20th-century British male artists
21st-century British male artists